LHK may refer to:

Larvik HK, Norwegian handball club
The Lighthouse Keepers, Australian band
Henk Krol List (Lijst Henk Krol), a Dutch political party